The Open Software License (OSL) is a software license created by Lawrence Rosen. The Open Source Initiative (OSI) has certified it as an open-source license, but the Debian project judged version 1.1 to be incompatible with the DFSG. The OSL is a copyleft license, with a termination clause triggered by filing a lawsuit alleging patent infringement.

Many people in the free software and open-source community feel that software patents are harmful to software, and are particularly harmful to open-source software. The OSL attempts to counteract that by creating a pool of software which a user can use if that user does not harm it by attacking it with a patent lawsuit.

Key features

Patent action termination clause
The OSL has a termination clause intended to dissuade users from filing patent infringement lawsuits:

Warranty of provenance
Another goal of the OSL is to warrant provenance.

Network deployment is distribution
OSL explicitly states that its provisions cover derivative works even when they are distributed only through online applications:

Linking does not create a derivative work
OSL in section 1(a) authorizes licensees to reproduce covered software "as part of a collective work," as distinct from the Original Work or a Derivative Work.  In section 1(c), only Derivate Works or copies of the Original Work are made subject to the license, not collective works. Derivative Work is defined in section 1(b) as being created when the licensee exercise their ability "to translate, adapt, alter, transform, modify, or arrange the Original Work."

Rosen has written:

Comparison with the LGPL and GPL
The OSL is intended to be similar to the LGPL. Note that the definition of Derivative Works in the OSL does not cover linking to OSL software/libraries so software that merely links to OSL software is not subject to the OSL license.

The OSL is not compatible with the GPL. It has been claimed that the OSL is intended to be legally stronger than the GPL (with the main difference "making the software available for use over the Internet requires making the source code available" that is the same goal as the even newer GNU Affero General Public License (AGPL), that is compatible with GPLv3), however, unlike the GPL, the OSL has never been tested in court and is not widely used.

Assent to license
The restriction contained in Section 9 of the OSL reads:

In its analysis of the OSL the Free Software Foundation claims that "this requirement means that distributing OSL software on ordinary FTP sites, sending patches to ordinary mailing lists, or storing the software in an ordinary version control system, can arguably be a violation of the license and would subject violators to possible termination of the license. Thus, the OSL makes it challenging to develop software using the ordinary tools of Free Software development."

Distribution
If the FSF claim is true then the main difference between the GPL and OSL concerns possible restrictions on redistribution.  Both licenses impose a kind of reciprocity condition requiring authors of extensions to the software to license those extensions with the respective license of the original work.

Patent action termination clause
The patent action termination clause, described above, is a further significant difference between the OSL and GPL.

Further provisions
Derivative Works must be distributed under the same license. (§1c)
Covered works that are distributed must be accompanied by the source code, or access to it made available. (§3)
No restrictions on charging money for programs covered by the license, but source code must be included or made available for a reasonable fee. (§3)
Covered works that are distributed must include a verbatim copy of the license. (§16)
Distribution implies (but does not explicitly state) a royalty-free license for any patents embodied in the software. (§2)

Later versions
It is optional, though common for the copyright holder to add “or any later version” to the distribution terms in order to allow distribution under future versions of the license. This term is not directly mentioned in the OSL. However, it would seem to violate section 16, which requires a verbatim copy of the license.

Open software that uses the OSL
ClearCanvas (sold), Enterprise-ready DICOM Viewer and RIS/PACS
Magento, an eCommerce web application
PrestaShop, an eCommerce web application
Mulgara, a triplestore written in Java (new code is being contributed using the Apache 2.0 license.)
The Graphical Models Toolkit (GMTK), a dynamic Bayesian network prototyping system
Akeneo PIM (software), a Product Information Management application

Open software that used the OSL
 NUnitLite up to 2.0 Alpha, a lightweight version of NUnit, NUnitLite is available under MIT / X / Expat Licence
CodeIgniter v3.0, an open source PHP framework (planned to use OSL, dropped because of GPL incompatibility for MIT License, may have used only for a short time for development release)

See also

Academic Free License – similar, but not reciprocal license by the same author
Open source license
 Software using the Open Software License (category)

References

External links
The Open Software License v.3.0
The Universal Permissive License (UPL)
The DFSG and Software Licenses
Philosophy of the GNU Project by the Free Software Foundation.

Free and open-source software licenses
Copyleft software licenses